The 2017 College Hockey America Women's Ice Hockey Tournament was the 15th tournament in league history played between March 2 and March 4, 2017, at the Harborcenter in Buffalo, New York. Robert Morris won their second tournament and earned College Hockey America's automatic bid to the 2017 NCAA National Collegiate Women's Ice Hockey Tournament.

Format
The 2017 format was the first single week-end format, with a single game quarterfinal round.

All six CHA Teams participated in the Tournament. On the first day of the Tournament, the top two seeds received a bye, while the #3 seed played the #6 seed, and the #4 seed played the #5 seed in the Quarterfinal round. On the second day, the Semifinal games featured the #1 seed against the lowest remaining seed, while the #2 seed played the highest remaining seed. On the third and final day, the CHA Championship was played between the two Semifinal winners. There was a total of five games.

Standings

Tournament Champion: Robert Morris

Note: * denotes overtime period(s)

RMU Goaltender Jessica Dodds was named the Tournament MVP

The Tournament Champion earned a berth in the 2017 NCAA National Collegiate Women's Ice Hockey Tournament to determine the national champion. The Robert Morris Colonials were the number 8 seed out of 8 in the tournament, and lost to #1 seed Wisconsin 7–0  on March 11, in Madison, Wisconsin.

References

College Hockey America Women's Ice Hockey Tournament
21st century in Buffalo, New York
CHA Women's Ice Hockey Tournament
Sports in Buffalo, New York